The 2011 National Club Baseball Association (NCBA) Division II World Series was played at Point Stadium in Johnstown, PA from May 20 to May 24. The fourth tournament's champion was Penn State University.

Format
The format for the NCBA Division II World Series was modified in 2011. From 2008 to 2010, there were two separate four team double elimination brackets similar to the NCAA College World Series with the exception a one-game championship between the two bracket winners.  Another difference which is between NCBA Division I and II is that Division II games are 7 innings while Division I games are 9 innings.

Starting in 2011, the losers of Games 1-4 were sent to the other half of the bracket. With this format, there could be a possibility of two teams meeting in the first round playing in the national championship game.

Participants 
Central Missouri
Furman
Hofstra
Longwood
Penn State†
Texas State
Wisconsin†
Wyoming
† denotes school also fielded an NCBA Division I team that season

Results

Bracket

Game Results

Championship Game

See also
2011 NCBA Division I World Series

Notes
Penn State's extra inning victory over Wyoming set two NCBA Division World Series championship game records.  The first of which was the most combined runs scored by both teams in a title game (24) and most runs by a single team in a title game (13, Penn State).

References

Baseball in Pennsylvania
2011 in baseball
National Club Baseball Association
NCBA Division II